Steven Wolf (aka Wolf) is a drummer, programmer, songwriter and music producer. His discography includes numerous gold, platinum, and Grammy winning records. He has worked with a range of artists including Alicia Keys, Katy Perry, Beyoncé, Annie Lennox, Miley Cyrus, Pink, Aretha Franklin, Avril Lavigne, Britney Spears, Celine Dion, Bee Gees, David Bowie, and Grover Washington, Jr. Notable songs include Katy Perry's "I Kissed a Girl," Avril Lavigne's "Girlfriend", Miley Cyrus's "Wrecking Ball".

Modern Drummer Magazine calls Wolf a "modern-day hit-making machine".

Wolf attended Berklee College of Music.

Wolf was featured on the cover of DrumHead Magazine in 2018.

References

External links
Website

Living people
American drummers
Record producers from New York (state)
Remixers
American session musicians
Musicians from Philadelphia
Musicians from New York City
Songwriters from Pennsylvania
Songwriters from New York (state)
Year of birth missing (living people)
Record producers from Pennsylvania
Berklee College of Music alumni